The Jefferson Hotel is a luxury hotel in Richmond, Virginia, United States, opened in 1895. In 1969, it was listed on the National Register of Historic Places.

The Jefferson is a member of Historic Hotels of America, the official program of the National Trust for Historic Preservation. On site is "Lemaire", a restaurant named after Etienne Lemaire, who served as maitre d'hotel to Thomas Jefferson from 1794 through the end of his presidency.

History 
Tobacco baron Lewis Ginter planned the development of the hotel as a premier property in the city of Richmond. It was designed in the Spanish Baroque Style by Carrère and Hastings, noted national architects based in New York City who later designed the New York Public Library. Construction began in 1892 and the hotel opened for business on October 31, 1895. After a fire gutted the interior of the hotel in 1901, it had a lengthy restoration. It reopened in 1907. It has received restorations and upgrades of systems through the years.

Patrons have included thirteen United States presidents, writers, and celebrities, including Henry James, Charles Lindbergh, The Rolling Stones, Dolly Parton, Elvis Presley, and Anthony Hopkins.

In 1901, there was a wire fire that destroyed three-fifths of the hotel. There were no casualties; however, the statue of Thomas Jefferson was almost destroyed. The sculptor and crew pushed the statue on a mattress and pulled it to safety. During the rescue process, the head broke off. Eventually, the sculpture was repaired. In March 1944, another fire occurred. Six people were killed during the fire.

In the check-in lobby, known as the Palm Court, nine original stained glass Tiffany windows with the hotel's monogram remain. The three stained glass windows above the front desk and the stained glass dome are reproductions.

Alligators in the lobby 
In his autobiography The Moon's a Balloon (1972), Academy Award-winning actor David Niven described a trip from New York to Florida in the late 1930s, during which he decided to spend the night at the Jefferson Hotel. Niven said that, as he was signing the guest registry in the lobby, his eyes snapped open with amazement when he noticed a full-sized alligator swimming in a small pool located six feet from the reception desk. The alligators at the Jefferson became world-famous. Old Pompey, the last alligator living in the marble pools of the Jefferson's Palm Court, survived until 1948. Bronze statues of the alligators now decorate the hotel. Its restaurant, Lemaire, has a theme of alligator motifs.

In culture 
The hotel and its restaurant were used for filming interior scenes for the 1981 American film My Dinner with Andre, featuring Wallace Shawn and Andre Gregory.

References 
Notes

Citations

Further reading 
  (Promotional brochure)

External links 

 
 Jefferson Hotel, Main, Jefferson, Franklin & Adams Streets, Richmond, Independent City, VA: 24 photos and 11 data pages at Historic American Buildings Survey

Hotels in Richmond, Virginia
Hotels established in 1895
Hotel buildings on the National Register of Historic Places in Virginia
National Register of Historic Places in Richmond, Virginia
Historic American Buildings Survey in Virginia
Carrère and Hastings buildings
Beaux-Arts architecture in Virginia
Preferred Hotels & Resorts
1895 establishments in Virginia
Sheraton hotels
Historic Hotels of America